The term “School Brand”, similar to "brand" as it applies to traditional business applications, is any type of term, mark or insignia, which identifies one organization or product from another. These marks were intended to indicate an affiliation with a particular school, group, organization, trade, manufacturer, or maker.

History 

While “branding” has history as far back as 1100 BCE, in a period referred to as the Vedic Period, “School Branding”, however, is a relatively new concept. Many universities and colleges now operate in a business like market where students are “customers” and other schools are competition. To successfully compete, a school must develop and market its own brand that differentiates it from the thousands of other schools vying for students and funding. Although most have marketing budgets, schools are still climbing the learning curve when relating to effective branding.

According to Branding Strategy Insider, school branding surfaced in the early 1800s when a few sororities and fraternities literally branded their pledges. Meanwhile, tobacco and patent medicine companies began branding their products as a way to identify them and build buyer loyalty. Brand identity also helped protect the customer by holding companies more accountable for product quality. By the mid-1800s, branding became central to business strategy as consumer companies such as Procter & Gamble began using it in their marketing.

Higher education waited over a century to follow the corporate world. According to University Business, schools adopted branding in the early 2000s, when they realized that higher learning had evolved into a marketplace of customers and providers. The rise of for-profit and online universities created more choices for students, and those newer schools were aggressively marketing in corporate style. Students were becoming more diverse, and schools could no longer take demographics for granted. At the same time, schools ranging from elementary to colleges and universities, had to compete harder for government funding and private endowments. To meet the challenges, universities invested in market research, logos and other marketing efforts that often cost hundreds of thousands of dollars.

Present situation 

Today’s school branding goes a step further and identifies a school’s unique competitive advantage. As stated in the Gallup Business Journal, a brand promises what the student experience will be like. However, many school departments produce their own distinctive communications, which can muddy the message. Colleges are grappling with the fact that the message is only effective if the entire faculty and leadership commit as one voice to the brand promise.

Schools also need to communicate their brand in a way that resonates emotionally with students. When people feel a message, they are more likely to remember it and respond. Brandgarten advocates using archetypes in branding to focus the emotional message. For example, a school that places a high value on community service might use the archetype of the caregiver to tell its story. Prospective students would hear the call to service in all of the college's communications and could decide whether it was a potential match. Prior to branding, the same college would have been lost among superficially similar schools.

One recent rebranding occurred when Beaver College, in Pennsylvania, surveyed prospective students and discovered that 30 percent of people considering the university did not apply because of the name. As a result, Beaver College was rebranded as Arcadia University in 2001.

Recognition of need 

Harvard University, viewed as the college gold standard, relies on branding to help recruit students and donations. The university took a lesson from its own business school and has applied for trademarks to protect several taglines. According to Fast Company, Harvard has already won approval for the taglines "Ask what you can do" and "Lessons learned". Harvard has also taken the entrepreneurial step of licensing its name to an upscale clothing line, which helps with branding as well as its funding mission.

Although colleges may be fairly new to branding, Neuromarketing points out that they represent the longest-lived brands in the United States. Schools exist for decades and even centuries and today have thousands of rivals. As baby boomers age out of the education market, the declining number of prospective students is increasing competition among schools. Schools have responded with glossy marketing campaigns but still lag in branding. Neuromarketing notes that much college marketing material portrays similar images of a pleasant campus filled with smiling professors and a diverse student body. Websites, brochures and even tours often leave students and their families no wiser as to what makes a particular school special.

The missing ingredient is brand development, as Columbia University discovered in recent years. According to Neuromarketing, Columbia branded itself as the only Ivy League school in New York City and began showcasing the Manhattan experience in its marketing materials. Student applications have since increased over the competition, and many applicants cited location as the reason they chose Columbia University. Administrators of Columbia University realized that name recognition alone was not enough to attract more of the right students, and its branding strategy paid off.

Even as schools compete for students, those students are learning to brand themselves in an effort to impress colleges. High school is the right time to start building a personal brand, advises Visibility. Young students can take several steps to enhance their uniqueness, beginning with defining a niche that will serve as the core of their brand. To build the school brand, they can start a quality blog and network both online and offline about its subject. Additional help in for schools in building a brand can be found by extended resources to companies like VIP Branding, who specializes in school branding. The allocation of resources to expert branding companies, allows school administrators to focus their attention to the needs of the school. By the time these students are ready to apply for college, they will have an edge over those who left personal branding up to the admissions essay.

Today’s students shop with brand awareness, and schools need to have a compelling message in place to attract them. Online school stores, like the ones offered through the Varsity Shop Program, provide a new avenue for schools to market themselves and their brand, through specialty designed and branded products. Although schools tends to be leery of corporate tactics, branding is an opportunity for them to define for themselves what makes them special. By doing so, schools enrich what they offer creating school spirit and student pride, helping students to carry that commitment and care onto higher education.

Repercussions of improper use 

While many school administrators recognize the power of school branding, the lack of resources and funding have led to alternative solutions to professional branding. Logo infringement has increased through the years as a result of this acknowledged need for branding. Numerous schools across the United States are infringing upon trademarked logos without realizing they are in violation. The Sanford Herald notated a recent case with Lake Mary High School out of Florida, was in such a case, when the school was given a cease and desist order to terminate the use of their ram logo because it was too similar the Dodge Ram logo. In most cases, logo infringement is accidental, but the resulting repercussions of using trademarked logos can lead to litigation, exorbitant fines, and can be disparaging on school morale.

In addition to logo infringement, the loss of brand identity is another resulting drawback to improper school branding. Unprofessionally designed logos or mascots can lead to an undesired identity or a variety of versions, which can lead to brand confusion as notated in by Brand Empowerment.

Elements 

School Name: The full or partial name that the school is best known as.
Mascot or Logo: The visual representation of the school that identifies the school brand.
School Colors: Colors selected by the school as a form of recognition.
Motto, catchphrase or tagline: Bishop Montgomery High School, uses their motto “Seek Justice, Speak Truth, Serve with Honor” to promote school pride. The branding slogan is typically used the school or group within the school to create a memorable phrase summarizes the organizations character.
Movement:  A trademarked logo, like the newest one designed for GlenOak High School, has a forward motion of the eagle mascot.
Interlock or Interlocking Logo: Characterized by interlocking two or more letters to form an alternative logo or secondary mark.

Benefits 

Increases school and student pride
Provides discernible school identification and recognition
Unifies school sports, clubs and booster clubs to a single identifiable mascot or logo
Validates school mission and core values
Builds trust and loyalty
Aligns schools internal culture and external reputation

References

Further reading
 The Power of Branding: Telling Your School′s Story

External links 
School Branding - The University Way: White Paper  7 Secrets That WIll Transform High School Brands

Brand management
Types of branding
Universities and colleges
Schools